Tor House and Hawk Tower are buildings in Carmel-by-the-Sea, California, United States.  They were the home of poet Robinson Jeffers and family from 1919 to 1999.

The two structures, often referred to jointly as Tor House, are generally believed to have played a crucial role in the development of Robinson Jeffers as a poet, and have inspired many a visitor. Stewart Brand, founder of the Whole Earth Catalog, describes Tor House as "a poem-like masterpiece" with "more direct intelligence per square inch than any other house in America".

Tor House 

The Jeffers family moved into Tor House in August 1919—after Robinson Jeffers had worked as an apprentice in its construction—and lived there for the remainder of their lives. Donnan Jeffers, one of the couple's two sons, lived with his family in the neighboring east wing of the house. They remained there until Donnan and his wife Lee died.

Jeffers named it Tor House after the type of ground on which the house was situated, a granite outcrop that might have been known as a "tor" in southwest England. He described the land he chose as the site for the house as being like a "prow and plunging cutwater" of a ship. The Carmel area's influence in Robinson Jeffers' work becomes apparent in his poems such as his work "The Purse Seine", a poem about the local fishing industry.

Jeffers' routine was to work on his poetry in the attic in the morning and to work on his building projects, such as Hawk Tower and expanding Tor House, in the afternoon.

Construction 

Robinson Jeffers and his wife Una bought land at Carmel Point in Spring 1919, and in mid-May they contracted Mike Murphy, an established Carmel developer, to build them a stone cottage at Carmel Point. Murphy's stonemason began work on the house immediately and, with Jeffers signing on later as an apprentice, was able to complete the project by mid-August. Initially the house had one bedroom, a kitchen, a living room, a bathroom, and an attic.

Soon after the cottage was complete, Jeffers himself would begin building a detached garage and a low, enclosing wall for a courtyard. He completed these in 1920, and then began to work on a tower that would take him four years to complete. After ceasing his stonework for a year or two, he then began work on a dining hall that would be completed in 1930. In 1937, Jeffers began work on an east wing that he intended to serve as a home for his sons, who were both in their 20s by then. He was unable to finish this last project due to declining health, but his son Donnan managed to complete it.

The style of stonework on the property varies widely, from rectangular, cut stone of the original cottage, to the pick-a-rock-that-fits stonework of the garage and house extensions, to the wildly pocked and twisting character of Hawk Tower, to the minimalistic work performed by Donnan Jeffers on the East Wing. Stonework from 1924 onward tends to include a wealth of fragments from around the world, including stones, tiles, and various carvings. Quite a number of quotations are also etched in the stone and woodwork of the house.

The cottage was lit by oil lamps until 1949, when Una, dying from cancer, permitted the house to be wired for electricity.

Hawk Tower 

After completing a stone garage and wall on his own, Jeffers started work on a tower that would take him four years to complete. He began construction in 1920 at the behest of his wife Una. The stonework for the tower was completed in late 1924. The woodwork was completed by a paid carpenter in 1925. Jeffers named the tower Hawk Tower, purportedly after a hawk that appeared often while he was building the tower, but stopped appearing after he finished construction. He appeared to adopt the hawk as his symbol at the time, placing Una's symbol (a unicorn) above her second-floor door and a hawk above the door to his third-floor lookout.

It was while Jeffers was engaged in building Hawk Tower between 1920 and 1924 that Jeffers is thought to have discovered his voice as a poet. He compiled and printed a limited run of the book Tamar and Other Poems well into the final year of tower stonework. He was not able to find a major publisher for the book until several editors from the Book Club of California discovered him.

The Kuster House 

The Kuster House, or the Kuster Castle, is often mistaken for Tor House. It, like Tor House, was built with granite stones from the surf at Carmel Point, but it is a good deal larger. It was built by Una Jeffers' ex-husband Edward "Teddie" Kuster after he followed Una and Robinson Jeffers from Southern California to Carmel. When Kuster built his house (in 1920), he built it next to the Jeffers property. Since that time, most of the Jeffers estate has been sold off, and many houses have been built between the two. The appearance of Kuster's house was generally seen as a scandalous act by the townsfolk, a transparent attempt to win Una back (or at least out-compete her) with a bigger Tor House. In spite of this, Kuster and Jeffers are said to have remained on good terms. Kuster also built (and rebuilt) Carmel's Golden Bough Playhouse.

Visiting Tor House

Tor House is owned by the Robinson Jeffers Tor House Foundation and has been preserved as it looked during Robinson Jeffers' life. Tours are limited to six people and are available hourly from 10am to 3pm on Fridays and Saturdays. Reservations are required.

References

External links

Biographical museums in California
Carmel-by-the-Sea, California
Houses completed in 1919
Houses completed in 1962
Houses in Monterey County, California
Historic house museums in California
Houses on the National Register of Historic Places in California
Houses on the National Register of Historic Places in Monterey County, California
Literary museums in the United States
Museums in Monterey County, California
National Register of Historic Places in Monterey County, California
History of Monterey County, California
History of the Monterey Bay Area